The Sole National Central of Peasant Rounds of Peru (Spanish: Central Única Nacional de Rondas Campesinas del Perú - CUNARC-P) is the largest organization of rondas campesinas in Peru. The group consists indigenous peasants, organized into 1,000 local groups, that provide peacekeeping and justice services in rural areas of Peru.

History 
Prior to the 2021 Peruvian general election, CUANRC-P and Pedro Castillo maintained a friendly relationship. The Ministry of Culture of Peru added CUNARC-P to the Database of Indigenous or Indigenous Peoples (BDPI) in April 2022 to grant the group official political participation in governmental actions. During the 2022–2023 Peruvian political protests, CUNARC-P joined in demonstrations against the government of Dina Boluarte.

References 

Internal conflict in Peru
Paramilitary organisations based in Peru
Non-military counterinsurgency organizations